John Penn (May 17, 1741  September 14, 1788) was an American Founding Father who served multiple terms in the Continental Congress, and who signed both the Declaration of Independence and Articles of Confederation as a delegate of North Carolina.

Biography
Penn was born near Port Royal in Caroline County, Virginia, the only son of Moses Penn and Catherine (Taylor) Penn. He attended at common school for two years as his father did not consider education to be important.At age 18, after his father's death, Penn privately read law with his uncle, Edmund Pendleton. He became a lawyer in Virginia in 1762. 

On July 28, 1763, Penn married Susannah Lyne. The couple had three children. Their daughter, Lucy, married John Taylor of Caroline, a political leader from Virginia. 

In 1774, Penn moved to the Stovall, North Carolina. There, he was a representative at the colony's Third Provincial Congress in August 1775. In 1775 Penn was elected to the Continental Congress. He was re-elected in 1777, 1778 and 1779 and is said to have served with distinction. During his tenure, he signed the Declaration of Independence and the Articles of Confederation.

In 1780 Penn was appointed to the North Carolina board of war. Following his appointment to the Congress, he practiced law until his death in 1788.

Legacy
The naval ship USS John Penn was named in his honor. A historical highway marker honoring Penn was erected in near his home in Stovall in 1936; it was the first such marker erected by the state of North Carolina.

See also
 Memorial to the 56 Signers of the Declaration of Independence

Sources

References

External links

 Biography by Rev. Charles A. Goodrich, 1856
 Biography and portrait at USHistory.org

Founding Fathers of the United States
1741 births
1788 deaths
Continental Congressmen from North Carolina
18th-century American politicians
Signers of the United States Declaration of Independence
Signers of the Articles of Confederation
People from Port Royal, Virginia
People from Granville County, North Carolina
American lawyers admitted to the practice of law by reading law
American slave owners